The Manhattan Gardens, also known as the Manhattan Gardens at Araneta City is a  transit-oriented residential development located at the Araneta City in Cubao, Quezon City. The project is a joint-venture project between the Araneta Group and the Megaworld Corporation, and marketed under Empire East Land Holdings Inc., a subsidiary of the Megaworld Corporation. The development is currently under development with 1 tower topped off and 10 out of the 18 buildings completed, with 7 more towers set to be constructed in the pipeline.

History and planning
The origins of the Manhattan Gardens, formerly named as the "Manhattan Garden City" before the Araneta City brand relaunch, were first traced in the following months after the People Power Revolution. As business optimism grew during the Presidency of Corazon Aquino, Araneta Group CEO Jorge L. Araneta launched a mixed-use residential and retail development, named the "Manhattan Tower" project. The project became a hit to local and foreign investors, and groundbreaking began in 1988, located along the present location of the Manhattan Parkview complex. However, the project hit a snag and was scrapped in 1989 in the aftermath of the 1989 coup attempt that rocked Metro Manila. 

As the Araneta Center began deteriorating in the 1990s, the shops within the area began to shut its doors due to financial issues, political uncertainties, and rising competition from newer malls within Metro Manila. A few years later, as the Araneta Group managed to stabilize its financial foundations, the planned development was revived and was part of the Araneta City master plan unveiled in 2000. In 2005, an agreement was signed between Jorge Araneta and Andrew Tan for the construction of the project. The demolition for the old buildings to give way for the new project began in 2006, and was completed in 2007, while the overall construction of the complex began within 2007, with the erection of the Manhattan Parkway, and in 2011, as the Manhattan Parkview and the Manhattan Heights followed suit. The project consists of 18 residential towers, which will have 9,000 estimated units upon completion and will soon house an estimated 36,000 residents.

During the early stages of planning in 2006-2011, a total of 17 towers were planned to be built. Nonetheless, additional proposals were laid out to build Manhattan Heights as a 6-tower residential complex, while the Manhattan Plaza features designs inspired from the Empire State Building, and the number of towers within the development were expanded from 5 towers to 8 towers, wherein the 8th tower will include a spire within the tower's roof, and totaling the development to 20 towers. The plans were finalized in 2012, as the number of towers were reduced to 18 towers, and the structural designs for the proposed Manhattan Heights and Manhattan Plaza were changed. In 2014, the design for the Manhattan Plaza was changed and was inspired from the Rockefeller Center, but was initially changed in 2017 and includes private gardens in selected units. 

The site of the Manhattan Parkway was originally the site of the Matsuzakaya Department Store, which became the first Japanese Department Store to open in the country during the 1960s, located alongside the Rempson Department Store, currently occupied by ABE International Business College, while the site of the Manhattan Parkview was the former Nation Cinerama, one of the first original movie theatres to open in the area. The Nation Cinerama was initially demolished in 1986 to give way for the planned Manhattan Tower plan, and was left intact for 22 years, before it currently serves as the present foundations of the Manhattan Parkview complex. Meanwhile, the location of the Manhattan Heights sits on abandoned car accessory shops, and the former site of the Araneta Center Bus Station, the first integrated bus terminal in the country, completed in 1993, before being relocated to the old Rustan's Superstore building at Times Square Avenue in 2011, while the Manhattan Plaza is located adjoined to the old Rustan's Superstore, currently occupied by the Araneta Center Bus Station, located on Times Square Avenue, completed in 1974. Rustan's relocated its operations to the Gateway Mall following the mall's opening in 2005.

Presently, the construction of the fourth and final phase of the project, the Manhattan Plaza, began in 2014. The latest development consists of eight towers, including the planned "Icon Tower". The targeted completion of the entire residential development is set within 2030, as part of the Araneta Group's Vision 2030 plan.

Development

The Manhattan Gardens consists of 4 residential developments (Manhattan Parkway, Manhattan Parkview, Manhattan Heights, Manhattan Plaza), which gives direct access to the MRT 3 Cubao and LRT 2 Cubao stations, as well as other buildings in the Araneta City, such as Ali Mall, SM Cubao, Araneta City Cyberpark, the Gateway Mall, the Farmers Plaza, the New Frontier Theater, the Gateway Tower and the Ibis Styles Araneta City, with elevated bridge-ways connecting each building for accessibility and comfort of its residents.

The first two developments consists of three towers each, with each tower adopting identical architectural designs in  exteriors of the towers. These towers are located at the northeastern area of the Araneta City, along the Aurora Boulevard and Gen. Malvar Avenue.

The third development, the Manhattan Heights, is located at the southeastern area of the city, along Gen. Romulo Avenue, and consists of 4 towers. Construction began in 2011, and was initially planned to be completed in 2017. However, the project faced many issues, before being fully completed in 2019, housing the Araneta City Bus Port in the ground floor, beneath the Manhattan Heights Tower D.

The fourth and final development of the project, the Manhattan Plaza, also located along Gen. Romulo Avenue, consists of 8 towers, and will feature the Icon Tower, a 60-storey tower; and the Spanish Steps. The upcoming development will soon have direct access to the City Plaza, a 2 hectare mixed-use development comprising retail and leisure spaces, premium graded offices and residential units, a multi-storey 4-star hotel, and green civic spaces. The second building within the complex, the Manhattan Plaza Tower 2, began being erected subsequently within 2018, before being topped off in October 2021, and is set to be completed within 2023.

The architecture of the buildings features a Manhattan-inspired designs, lush green spaces and garden-inspired landscaping in all its buildings, featuring clustered Garden Villas located at the Manhattan Parkview, and sky gardens within the complex. Each of the towers feature a variety of upward curved rooftops within each development, seen in towers within the Manhattan Parkway and the Manhattan Parkview, which features a curved glass rooftop designs. The Manhattan Heights characterizes a curved rooftop arch with a skylight within the tower's sky gardens, which is similar to Ali Mall's General Romulo Avenue entrance, while the Manhattan Plaza features a wavy rooftop arch, connected with a spire within the tower's topmost floors. The development also includes additional parking spaces for both guests, shoppers and residents throughout the complex. The Manhattan Gardens also houses dining, retail, and leisure establishments, such as the famed Manhattan Row, located along Gen. Malvar Avenue, between the Manhattan Parkway and the Manhattan Parkview towers. The Manhattan Row also offers al fresco dining and entertainment events.

Gallery

References

Buildings and structures in Quezon City
Residential buildings in Metro Manila